Andro is one of the 60 constituencies of the Manipur Legislative Assembly. It is one of the 32 constituencies forming the parliamentary constituency of Inner Manipur.

Members of the Legislative Assembly

Election results

2022

2017

2012

See also
 List of constituencies of the Manipur Legislative Assembly
 Imphal East district

References

External links
  

Imphal East district
Assembly constituencies of Manipur